Caraz, Carás or Caraz de Santa Cruz is a mountain in the Cordillera Blanca in the Andes of Peru, about  high. It is located in the Ancash Region, Huaylas Province, in the districts Caraz and Santa Cruz District. This peak is inside Huascarán National Park, most precisely southwest of Artesonraju, northwest of Pirámide, north of Lake Parón and south of Santa Cruz Creek. Its slopes are within two Peruvian cities: Santa Cruz and Caraz.

Elevation 
The height of the nearest key col is 3253 meters, leading to a topographic prominence of 2772 meters. Caraz is considered a Mountain Sub-System according to the Dominance System  and its dominance is 46.01%. Its parent peak is Chacraraju and the Topographic isolation is 6.6 kilometers.

First Ascent 
Caraz was first climbed by Hermann Huber, Alfred Koch and Helmut Schmidt in 1956.

See also 

 Hatunqucha
 Ichikqucha
 Sintiru

References

External links 

 Elevation information about Caraz
 Weather Forecast at Caraz

Mountains of Peru
Mountains of Ancash Region